The following Union Army units and commanders fought in the Second Battle of Winchester of the American Civil War. The Confederate order of battle is listed separately.

Abbreviations used

Military rank
 MG = Major General
 BG = Brigadier General
 Col = Colonel
 Ltc = Lieutenant Colonel
 Maj = Major
 Cpt = Captain

Second Division, VIII Corps 
MG Robert H. Milroy 

(8219 officers & men) (103 KIA, 3 MW, 349 WIA, 4210 MIA = 4657 total casualties)

References
 Grunder, Charles S. and Beck, Brandon H. The Second Battle of Winchester (2nd Edition). Lynchburg, VA: H.E. Howard, Inc., 1989. 
 Maier, Larry B. Gateway to Gettysburg: The Second Battle of Winchester. Burd Street Press: Shippensburg, Pennsylvania, 2002. 
Wittenberg, Eric J. and Mingus Sr., Scott L. The Second Battle of Winchester: The Confederate Victory that Opened the Door to Richmond (1st Edition). El Dorado Hills, CA: Savas Beatie LLC, 2016. ISBN 97811212891

American Civil War orders of battle